Under the Iraqi constitution of 1925, Iraq was a constitutional monarchy, with a bicameral legislature consisting of an elected House of Representatives and an appointed Senate. The lower house was elected every four years by manhood suffrage (women did not vote). The first Parliament met in 1925. Ten general elections were held before the overthrow of the monarchy in 1958. 

Between 1958 and 2003 Iraq was ruled by multiple dictatorships, socialist, arabist then ba'athist Under the regime of Ahmed Hassan Al Bakr, who came to power in 1968 then saddam Hussein in 1979, Saddam's rule was largely run by Sunni Arabs and Saddam himself was a Sunni Muslim. On 16 October 2002, after a well-publicized show election, Iraqi officials declared that Saddam had been re-elected to another seven-year term as President by a 100% unanimous vote of all 11,445,638 eligible Iraqis, eclipsing the 99.96% received in 1995. 
Foreign governments dismissed the vote as lacking credibility.

January 2005 Iraqi parliamentary election 

The multinational force's 2003 invasion of Iraq overthrew Saddam's government and installed an interim administration.

An initial Iraqi attempt at holding local elections was canceled by Paul Bremer.

This government held elections on 30 January 2005 to begin the process of writing a constitution. International groups and the formerly excluded factions claimed that the January 2005 elections were the first free elections in Iraq's history, with a fair representation of all groups. This is in stark contrast to previous elections. After the 16 October 2002 referendum on the extension of his role as President, Saddam Hussein claimed that 100% of the voters voted "yes" and that 100% of Iraqi's had voted (approximately 24,001,820 people). Opponents of the occupation, such as the various insurgent groups, claimed the elections were not free and fair, citing flaws in the process. The UN adviser to Iraq's election commission Craig Jenness said the complaints were not significant; "I don't see anything that would necessitate a rerun.... There were nearly 7,000 candidates standing in this election and only 275 seats, so you're always going to have winners and losers and it's normal that the losers won't always be happy about it."

December 2005 Iraqi parliamentary election

2009: request for national elections 

The issue arising was the interpretation of Article 56 of the constitution which states:

First: The electoral term of the Council of Representatives shall be four calendar years, starting with its first session and ending with the conclusion of the fourth year.

Second: The new Council of Representatives shall be elected forty-five days before the conclusion of the preceding electoral term.
The previous election had been on 15 December 2005.

The opening session of the Council of Representatives had been 16 March 2006 (the swearing in session) and the first substantive session of the Council of Representatives was then held on 22 April 2006. The Court was of the opinion that the swearing in session on 16 March 2006 was the "first session" as required by Article 56(First). It therefore followed that the conclusion of the fourth year would be on 15 March 2010 and that the election should be 45 days prior to 15 March 2010, i.e., 30 January 2010.
The court decided that the calendar year referred to was the 365-day Gregorian year (and not for example the 360-day Hijri year).

2010 Iraqi parliamentary election

2013 provincial councils (local government) elections

2013 elections statistics
Overall turnout: 51% (Similar to turnout in 2009 Elections)
Number of registered eligible voters: Approx. 13,800,000 (Including 14,000 prisoners, 55,000 hospital patients and 53,000 displaced Iraqis eligible to vote).
Number of voters turned out: 6,400,777 voters
Elections are held: 12 provinces (out of 18 provinces).
Four provinces are part of the semi-autonomous region Kurdistan with their Elections in September 2013, two provinces (Anbar, Nineveh) requested to postpone their elections due to security reasons.

No. of seats contested: 378 seats in Province Councils (Local Government).
Number of candidates: 8138
Female candidates: 2205
Male candidates:  5933

This is the sixth voting exercise by Iraqis in 10 years:
2004 National Assembly Elections
2005 Constitution Referendum
2005 Parliamentary Elections
2009 Provincial Councils
2010 Parliamentary elections
2013 Provincial Council (Saturday 20 April)
Number of parties and alliances competing: 256 parties and 50 political alliances
International independent observers (non-Iraqi): 350
Local independent observers: 6,000 
Political parties’ observers (political entity representatives): 267,388
Polling stations: 5,370 (5,178)¹
Ballot boxes: 32,445 (32,201)² election ballot box
Including polling stations in prisons and hospitals.
Polling stations opening time: 07:00 to 17:00 (Baghdad Time)
IHEC Help Centre Freephone: 2800 calls received from voters. 
Local Help Centres set up by IHEC: 12 (one in each province).
IHEC staff (including reserve staff): 180,000
100% of staff in this election were Iraqis
Local journalists and media: 2,256 
International journalists: 187

Basrah
In Basrah the numbers were as follows:
Voter turnout: 42%

Registered eligible voters: Approx. 1,600,000 

Ballots cast: Approx. 650,000 

Candidates: 656

Contested seats: 35 Council seats (1 seat reserved for Christian quota)

Political entities: 25 (party and alliance)

In the first elections since the withdrawal of U.S. forces, the Iraqi Independent Electoral Commission (IHEC) confirmed that 6,400,777 voters cast their votes.

2018 parliamentary election

2021 Iraqi parliamentary election

See also

 Assyrian elections in Iraq
 History of Iraq
 Electoral calendar
 Electoral system
 2010 Iraqi Status of Forces Agreement referendum

References

External links
Iraqi Independent High Electoral Commission
Op-Ed by former Iraqi Premier Ayad Allawi on Iraqi electoral reform
Adam Carr's Election Archive 
UN rules out Iraqi election rerun
UN-led team finds Iraq election credible
Iraq's Electoral system is a part of the problem says Regional Expert
Provincial Elections in Iraq: Blow to Confessionalism (Qantara.de)
Global Justice Project: Iraq
 Iraq Inter-Agency Information & Analysis Unit Reports, Maps and Assessments of Iraq from the UN Inter-Agency Information & Analysis Unit